People of the Dark is a collection of stories by Robert E. Howard, published in 2005. It is the third volume of The Weird Works of Robert E. Howard series, by Wildside Press. The title story, "People of the Dark", is considered to be part of the Cthulhu Mythos. It was first published in Strange Tales, June 1932.

Contents
 "Kings of the Night"
 "The Children of the Night"
 "The Footfalls Within"
 "The Gods of Bal-Sagoth"
 "The Black Stone"
 "The Dark Man"
 "The Thing on the Roof"
 "The Horror from the Mound"
 "People of the Dark"

References

Short story collections by Robert E. Howard
Horror short story collections